During the 1998–99 English football season, Swindon Town F.C. competed in the Football League First Division.

Season summary
When the 1998–99 season kicked off, Swindon failed to win their first five games, scoring just three goals and the calls for McMahon's sacking began to be heard. Chairman Rikki Hunt and McMahon seemed united – McMahon saying he wouldn't resign, Hunt saying he wouldn't sack him. Two consecutive derby wins, against Bristol City and Oxford, only strengthened their position. This was followed by a 5–2 defeat at Portsmouth – and when Watford then won 4–1 at the County Ground, the fans held an on-pitch protest, sitting in the centre circle at the end of the match, demonstrating that both McMahon and Hunt should resign. McMahon left the club "by mutual consent". Jimmy Quinn was appointed as McMahon's replacement and managed to keep Swindon in the division with the club finishing the season in 17th place.

Final league table

Results
Swindon Town's score comes first

Legend

Football League First Division

FA Cup

League Cup

Squad

Left club during the season

References

Swindon Town F.C. seasons
Swindon Town